Olivier Lecat (born 30 April 1967) is a French volleyball player. He competed in the men's tournament at the 1992 Summer Olympics.

References

1967 births
Living people
French men's volleyball players
Olympic volleyball players of France
Volleyball players at the 1992 Summer Olympics
Sportspeople from Hauts-de-Seine